Radio Banovići is a Bosnian local public radio station, broadcasting from Banovići, Bosnia and Herzegovina.

Radio Banovići was launched on 25 May 1975 by the municipal council of Banovići. As local/municipal radio station in SR Bosnia and Herzegovina, it was part of Radio Sarajevo network affiliate.

Program is mainly produced in Bosnian language. This radio station broadcasts a variety of programs such as music, local news and talk shows. Estimated number of potential listeners is around 19,146.

Frequencies
 Banovići  
 Banovići

See also 
List of radio stations in Bosnia and Herzegovina

References

External links 
 www.radiobanovici.com.ba
 Communications Regulatory Agency of Bosnia and Herzegovina

Banovići
Radio stations established in 1975